Sir François Langelier,  (24 December 1838 – 8 February 1915) was a Canadian lawyer, professor, journalist, politician, the tenth Lieutenant Governor of Quebec, and author.  He was born in Sainte-Rosalie, Lower Canada (now Quebec) and died in Spencer Wood, Sillery, Quebec.

In 1871, he was an unsuccessful candidate to the Legislative Assembly of Quebec for the riding of Bagot. A Liberal, he was elected in an 1873 by-election for the riding of Montmagny. He was defeated in 1875 but was re-elected in 1878 for the riding of Portneuf. He was Commissioner of Crown Lands and Provincial Treasurer from 1878 to 1879. He was defeated in 1881. From 1880 to 1890, he was a municipal councillor in Quebec City and was mayor from 1882 to 1890.

He was elected to the House of Commons of Canada for Mégantic in an 1884 by-election, after the results for the 1882 election were declared void. He was re-elected for Quebec-Centre in the 1887, 1891, and 1896 elections. He resigned in 1898 when he was appointed a puisne judge of the Quebec Superior Court for the district of Montreal.

He was knighted in 1907 and was elected to the Royal Society of Canada in 1909. He was made a knight of the Order of St John of Jerusalem in England in 1912 and a knight of the Order of St Michael and St George on 31 December 1913.

From 1911 until his death in 1915, he was the Lieutenant Governor of Quebec.

His brother, Charles Langelier was also an MP from 1887 to 1890.

Electoral record

References
 Jocelyn Saint-Pierre, "LANGELIER, Sir FRANÇOIS", in Dictionary of Canadian Biography, vol. 14, University of Toronto/Université Laval, 2003–.
 
 
 Francis-J. Audet et al., "Les Lieutenants-Gouverneurs de la province de Québec" (in French), in Les Cahiers des Dix, volume 27, 1962, p. 239–241.

1838 births
1915 deaths
Canadian Knights Commander of the Order of St Michael and St George
Fellows of the Royal Society of Canada
Liberal Party of Canada MPs
Lieutenant Governors of Quebec
Mayors of Quebec City
Members of the House of Commons of Canada from Quebec
Judges in Quebec
Quebec Liberal Party MNAs
Academic staff of Université Laval
Université Laval alumni